A list of films produced in France in 1986.

Notes

External links
 1986 in France
 1986 in French television
 French films of 1986 at the Internet Movie Database
French films of 1986 at Cinema-francais.fr

1986
Films
French